Rancho Cucamonga station in Rancho Cucamonga, in San Bernardino County, California, serves the Metrolink San Bernardino Line commuter rail. The station is owned by the City of Rancho Cucamonga, and is near the former Empire Lakes Golf Club. It is located just west of Milliken Avenue and has 330 parking spaces.

Current Services 

Omnitrans routes 82, 380 (ONT Connect) serve a bus loop near the train platform. Route 380, also called ONT Connect, provides non-stop service between the station and Ontario International Airport and meets every train. It operates daily, every 35 to 60 minutes.

Future Upgrades 

The city is designing this as a multi-modal station as part of a new transit district. Brightline West service is planned be extended here. A proposed  underground people-mover would provide a link to the Ontario International Airport. Brightline purchased an adjacent  parcel for the high speed rail station in 2022.

References

External links 
 
  Omnitrans: Schedules/Maps (bus transit) 
 Omnitrans homepage

Metrolink stations in San Bernardino County, California
Rancho Cucamonga, California
Bus stations in San Bernardino County, California
Railway stations in the United States opened in 1994
1994 establishments in California